The Buffalo Sabres are a professional ice hockey team based in Buffalo, New York, United States.  The Sabres are members of the Atlantic Division of the Eastern Conference in the National Hockey League (NHL). Founded as an expansion franchise in 1970, the Sabres have had nine general managers since the team's inception.

Key

General managers

See also
List of NHL general managers

Notes
 A running total of the number of general managers of the franchise. Thus any general manager who has two or more separate terms as general manager is only counted once.

 During the 2013–14 interim in which there was no general manager, Pat LaFontaine fulfilled the duties of the position under the title of "President of Hockey Operations."

References

Buffalo Sabres
 
general managers
Buffalo Sabres general managers